Fear of bees (or of bee stings), technically known as melissophobia (from , , "honey bee" + , , , "fear") and also known as apiphobia (from  for "honey bee" + , , "fear"), is one of the common fears among people and is a kind of specific phobia.  It is similar to fear of wasps (which is often called spheksophobia). Both are types of entomophobia, which is itself a category of zoophobia.

Most people have been stung by a bee or had friends or family members stung. A child may fall victim by treading on a bee while playing outside. The sting can be quite painful and in some individuals results in swelling that may last for several days and can also provoke allergic reactions such as anaphylaxis, so the development of loathsome fear of bees is quite natural.

Ordinary (non-phobic) fear of bees in adults is generally associated with lack of knowledge. The general public is not aware that bees attack in defense of their hive, or when accidentally squashed, and an occasional bee in a field presents no danger. Moreover, the majority of insect stings in the United States are attributed to yellowjacket wasps, which are often mistaken for a honeybee.

Unreasonable fear of bees in humans may also have a detrimental effect on ecology. Bees are important pollinators, and when, in their fear, people destroy wild colonies of bees, they contribute to environmental damage and may also be the cause of the disappearing bees.

The renting of bee colonies for pollination of crops is the primary source of income for beekeepers in the United States, but as the fears of bees spread, it becomes hard to find a location for the colonies because of the growing objections of local population.

Africanized honey bees
A widespread fear of bees has been triggered by rumors about "killer bees". In particular, the Africanized bee is widely feared by the American public, a reaction that has been amplified by sensationalist movies and some media reports. Stings from Africanized bees kill one to two people per year in the United States, a rate that makes them less dangerous than venomous snakes, particularly since, unlike venomous snakes, they are found only in a small portion of the country.

As the bees spread through Florida, a densely populated state, officials worry that public fear may force misguided efforts to combat them. The Florida African Bee Action Plan states,
News reports of mass stinging attacks will promote concern and in some cases panic and anxiety, and cause citizens to demand responsible agencies and organizations to take action to help ensure their safety.  We anticipate increased pressure from the public to ban beekeeping in urban and suburban areas.  This action would be counter-productive.  Beekeepers maintaining managed colonies of domestic European bees are our best defense against an area becoming saturated with AHB.  These managed bees are filling an ecological niche that would soon be occupied by less desirable colonies if it were vacant."''

Treatment
Exposure therapy has been proven as an effective treatment for people who have a fear of bees. It is recommended that people place themselves in a comfortable open environment, such as a park or garden, and gradually over a prolonged period of time move closer to the bees. 

Using a camera or smartphone to photograph bees has also been shown to be helpful; as viewing the bees remotely (via a screen) provides a comfortable way to build up confidence. Over time, people may also find themselves moving closer to the bees to get better pictures.

This process should not be rushed, it may take many months spent watching bees before people feel comfortable in their presence.

Learning about bees also helps build up an understanding of their ecology, rationalise the fear and appreciate that they do not want to sting people. 

A recommended way of overcoming child's fear of bees is training to face fears (a common approach for treating specific phobias); programs vary.

See also
 List of phobias

Notes

Zoophobias
Bees
Beekeeping